A Vindication of The Rights of Whores is a 1989 anthology edited by  with a preface by Margo St. James.

The book consists of the voices of a diverse group of prostitutes, sex worker rights activists, and feminist scholars from around the world, discussing their lives and concerns.

It includes the complete text of the World Charter for Prostitutes' Rights; unedited transcripts of workshops arranged by topic from the First World Whores' Congress held in Amsterdam in February 1985 and Second World Whores' Congress at the European Parliament held in Brussels in October 1986; position papers; as well as interviews with various participants.

It is cited in at least 75 other works and appears in various reading lists and curriculum guides. The anthology's name references Mary Wollstonecraft's 18th-century feminist work A Vindication of the Rights of Woman.

See also
COYOTE
International Committee for Prostitutes' Rights
International Day to End Violence Against Sex Workers
Margo St. James
Revolting Prostitutes
Sex-positive feminism
Sex worker rights
Sex worker
World Charter for Prostitutes Rights

References

External links
Prostitutes' Education Network Bookstore
Biblio Services - Bookstore

1989 books
Sex workers' rights
Feminism and prostitution
Feminist books
Non-fiction books about prostitution
Seal Press books